Jaypee University is a private university located in Anoopshahr, Bulandshahr in Uttar Pradesh.It is part of the Jaypee Group.It has been established under UP act no 8 of 2014.

References

External links

Private universities in Uttar Pradesh
Bulandshahr district
Educational institutions established in 2014
2014 establishments in Uttar Pradesh